Valtteri Hotakainen (born April 24, 1990) is a Finnish ice hockey player who plays as a centre for Mikkelin Jukurit.

References

Living people
Mikkelin Jukurit players
JYP Jyväskylä players
Finnish ice hockey centres
1990 births
People from Kokkola
Sportspeople from Central Ostrobothnia